Crngrob is a small village in the Municipality of Škofja Loka in the Upper Carniola region of Slovenia.

Name
Crngrob was first attested in written sources as Erngrůb in 1291 (and as Errengrůb in 1318 and Erngruben in 1423). The Slovene name is borrowed from the Middle High German prepositional phrase ze Erngruben, literally 'at Erngrub'. The German name is a compound of ern 'to plow (up)' or erde '(fertile) soil' + gruobe 'depression, basin' and may refer to a mammoth rib dug up at the site (now hanging in the church), to a robber's hideout in a cave, or to the small fertile valley where the settlement is located. For similar Slovene geographical names based on foreign-language prepositional phrases of location, compare Cmurek, Cven, Dragonja, Sostro, and Spuhlja. In the past the German name was Ehrengruben.

History
Crngrob was recorded in documents from the 13th century onward. Much of the history of the village is dominated by that of its church. During the Second World War, German forces attached the Partisan Selca Company above the village on 27 March 1942. Fifteen Partisans were killed in the attack.

Mass graves

Crngrob is the site of five known mass graves from the end of the Second World War. The Crngrob 1–5 mass graves—also known as the Steps Mass Grave or the Balant Spruce Woods Mass Grave—are located along a gravel path in the woods southwest of the settlement. They contain the remains of 200 to 300 victims, including leading members of the government of the Independent State of Croatia and their family members, and possibly Slovene Home Guard members as well. Most of the victims were murdered between May 22 and 25, 1945. Some were killed as early as May 20, and some also after May.

Church and religious heritage

Crngrob is best known for its pilgrimage church dedicated to the Annunciation. The first mention of a church at this site dates to the late 13th century. In the 14th century it was expanded, and after 1410 a southern arcade was built. In the mid-15th century a third aisle was added and in 1551 the belfry was heightened and in 1661 its onion-shaped dome was built. Its characteristic neogothic columned porch was erected in 1858.

The church's artwork includes a painting of Holy Sunday from the workshop of Johannes of Ljubljana (ca. 1460), a Gothic painting of Saint Christopher on the south wall from 1464, a painting of Saint Christopher on the bell tower, and remnants of frescoes from the 14th and 15th centuries on the north wall of the nave. There are four 17th-century gilded altars where the nave meets the chancel; above the altar dedicated to Saint Martin there hangs a whale rib, referred to as the rib of a giantess in popular tradition. The main altar was created in 1652 by the Ljubljana sculptor Jurij Skarnos and was gilded by Jakob Jamšek of Škofja Loka. The forged railing in front of the main altar was created by the Škofja Loka locksmith Gregor Jesenko. The Baroque organ, work by the organ builder Joannes Franciscus Janecheck, dates to 1743.

The church was a popular pilgrimage destination in the past, and so there are many wayside shrines along the routes leading to the church. The Red Shrine stands along the road to Škofja Loka. It has frescoes from the 16th century and is one of the oldest shrines in Slovenia. The Oman Chapel-Shrine near the woods contains an 18th-century carving by a peasant artist, and below the church there is another chapel-shrine from the 18th century that was painted by Anton Tušek.

Notes

References

External links 

Crngrob at Geopedia

Populated places in the Municipality of Škofja Loka